Pomelovka is a rural locality (a village) in Kichmegnskoye Rural Settlement, Kichmengsko-Gorodetsky District, Vologda Oblast, Russia. The population was 22 as of 2002.

Geography 
Pomelovka is located 11 km southwest of Kichmengsky Gorodok (the district's administrative centre) by road. Navolok is the nearest rural locality.

References 

Rural localities in Kichmengsko-Gorodetsky District